The WNBA Finals are the championship series of the Women's National Basketball Association (WNBA) and the conclusion of the league's postseason each fall. The series was named the WNBA Championship until 2002. Starting 2016 Verizon is the official sponsor.

The series is played between the winners of the playoff semifinals. At the conclusion of the championship round, the winner of the WNBA Finals is presented the championship trophy. The WNBA Finals has been played at the conclusion of every WNBA season in history, the first being held in 1997.

Since 2005, the winner of the WNBA Finals has been determined through a 2–2–1 format. The first, second, and fifth games of the series are played at the arena of the team who earned home court advantage by having the better record during the regular season.

History

The WNBA's playoff format has changed several times in the league's history. From 1997 to 1998, a single championship game was held to decide the champion. In 1998, after the addition of two teams, the WNBA Finals were turned into a best-of-three games series. The finale series was known as the WNBA Championship from 1997 to 2001, before changing to reflect its NBA counterpart. In 2005, the WNBA Finals adopted a best-of-five format. In 2016, the WNBA changed to its current playoff format seeding teams #1 through #8 regardless of conference making it possible for two Eastern Conference or two Western Conference teams to meet in the Finals.

Highlights
In 2001, the #4 seed Charlotte Sting was the lowest seed to make the WNBA Finals.
The 2003 Finals was best known for rekindling a heated rivalry between the two teams' head coaches, Los Angeles Sparks head coach Michael Cooper and former Detroit Shock head coach Bill Laimbeer. Both coaches were fierce NBA competitors who played in the NBA Finals against each other in 1988 and 1989.
2006 marked the first time that a #1 seed did not participate in the WNBA Finals. Detroit and Sacramento were both #2 seeds.
The New York Liberty and Connecticut Sun have the most Finals appearances (4) without winning a championship.
The Minnesota Lynx are the sixth team to win multiple championships (following Houston, Los Angeles, Detroit, Phoenix and Seattle, respectively).
2006 marked the first time that the team with the best point-differential in the regular-season did not win the WNBA Finals or even advance to the WNBA finals.  The Connecticut Sun had the best point differential in '06 but was ousted by the Shock in the Eastern Conference Finals.
The Detroit Shock hosted the three largest crowds in Finals History (22,076 in Game 3 of 2003 WNBA Finals, 19,671 in Game 5 of 2006 WNBA Finals and 22,076 in Game 5 of the 2007 WNBA Finals)
Only five Eastern Conference franchises have won the WNBA Finals: the 1997 Houston Comets (who moved to the Western Conference the following year); the Detroit Shock (who are now in the Western Conference first as Tulsa, now as Dallas), the Indiana Fever in 2012, the Washington Mystics in 2019, and the Chicago Sky in 2021.
The 2007 game-five win by the Phoenix Mercury marked the first time in WNBA history that a team won the Finals while playing on their opponent's home court.
In 2008 the San Antonio Silver Stars became the first team in the history of the WNBA Finals to be swept in a five-game series losing to the Detroit Shock.
The 2009 Finals series saw around a 60% increase in viewership from the previous season's series.
The 2011 WNBA Finals was the first coached by two women.
In 2014, the Chicago Sky became the first team to appear in the WNBA Finals with a sub-.500 record.
 In 2016, the Los Angeles Sparks won by one point despite a later announcement by the WNBA that officials missed an earlier shot-clock violation at 1:14, which should not have counted.

Finals appearances
Statistics below refer to series wins and losses, not individual game wins and losses.
Teams in red have folded and can no longer reach the WNBA Finals.

1Folded following 2006 season
2Folded following 2008 season
3Relocated from Detroit to Tulsa following 2009 season & Dallas following 2015 season
4Folded following 2009 season
5 Relocated from Utah to San Antonio 2003 and to Las Vegas 2018

Records
This table shows a list of records through the history of the WNBA Finals.

See also

References

External links
WNBA.com

Recurring sporting events established in 1997
 
Lists of sports championships